The Burlsworth Trophy is an award given annually to the most outstanding FBS college football player who began his career as a walk-on. It was first awarded for the 2010 season and is a program of the Brandon Burlsworth Foundation. Burlsworth walked on to the Arkansas Razorbacks football program in 1994 and became an All-American. He was killed in a car accident 11 days after being selected by the Indianapolis Colts in the third round of the 1999 NFL draft.

On October 28, 2019, the Burlsworth Trophy became a member of the National College Football Awards Association (NCFAA). It joins the Broyles Award as the only members of the NCFAA originating in Arkansas. The trophy was sculpted and produced by Raymond Gibby of Nobility Bronze in Pea Ridge, Arkansas.

Winners and finalists

References

External links
 Burlsworth Trophy.com
 Nobility Bronze (Sculptor of the Burlsworth Trophy)

College football national player awards
Awards established in 2010
Springdale, Arkansas